Skagersvik is a locality situated in Gullspång Municipality, Västra Götaland County, Sweden. It had 250 inhabitants in 2010.

References 

Populated places in Västra Götaland County
Populated places in Gullspång Municipality